Auriel Bessemer  (February 27, 1909 – 1986) was an American muralist, painter, designer, illustrator and author born in Grand Rapids, Michigan.  He studied with Leon Kroll and Arthur Covey, at the Art Students League in New York City, Columbia University, and National Academy of Design.

Bessemer was an artist with the Section of Painting and Sculpture. He painted post office murals in Winnsboro, South Carolina and Hazlehurst, Mississippi. He also completed seven murals at the United States Post Office in Arlington, Virginia. His Virginia murals depict agricultural and historical scenes and local destinations such as Great Falls and Roosevelt Island. The murals reflected local history and were designed to instill national pride in viewers.

References

1909 births
1986 deaths
Modern painters
20th-century American painters
American muralists
Section of Painting and Sculpture artists
Painters from Michigan
Artists from Grand Rapids, Michigan
American male painters
20th-century American male artists